This list of museums in Republic of Ireland contains museums which are defined for this context as institutions (including nonprofit organizations, government entities, and private businesses) that collect and care for objects of cultural, artistic, scientific, or historical interest and make their collections or related exhibits available for public viewing. Also included are non-profit art galleries and university art galleries. Museums that exist only in cyberspace (i.e., virtual museums) are not included. Many other small historical displays are located in the country's stately homes, including those run by the National Trust.

Defunct museums
 Bank of Ireland Arts Centre, Dublin
 Dublin Civic Museum, closed in 2003
 Museum of Irish Industry, Dublin, closed in 1866
 Sligo Art Gallery, closed 2010

See also
List of museums in Northern Ireland

References
 Irish Museums Association
 Maritime Museums

 
Ireland
Ireland education-related lists
Lists of buildings and structures in the Republic of Ireland
Lists of tourist attractions in Ireland
Ireland
Lists of organisations based in the Republic of Ireland